Muhlenbergia californica is an uncommon species of grass known by the common name California muhly.

Distribution
It is endemic to California Transverse Ranges, where it is known only from the San Bernardino Mountains in Southern California.

It grows in moist habitat, such as streambanks and ditches, in the chaparral and woodlands.

Description
Muhlenbergia californica is a rhizomatous perennial grass growing 30 to 70 centimeters tall. The inflorescence is a narrow array of thin branches bearing many tiny pointed or awned hairy spikelets each a few millimeters long.

References

External links
Jepson Manual Treatment - Muhlenbergia californica
Grass Manual Treatment:  Muhlenbergia californica

californica
Endemic flora of California
Native grasses of California
Natural history of the California chaparral and woodlands
Natural history of the Transverse Ranges
~
~
Flora without expected TNC conservation status